Petpet Park is a defunct virtual pet website launched by Nickelodeon (formerly Neopets) in October 2008. The site was created by the creators of Neopets and Monkey Quest. The game featured a new virtual world focused on Neopets' companions, Petpets: there were nine species in Petpet Park to choose from.  Once chosen, users could help train them through games, activities and challenges and customise them and take them out to explore the park and meet friends.

On September 9, 2014, it was announced via Neopets that Petpet Park would cease all operations and be taken offline following its purchase by JumpStart.

Company 

Nickelodeon Kids & Family Virtual Worlds Group, formerly Neopets, Inc., develops and manages all virtual world initiatives for kids, preteens, teens and families for the Nickelodeon Kids & Family Group. Petpet Park was a virtual world based on one of their most popular properties, Neopets.

History 

On September 4, 2008, Neopets began a Petpet Park mini plot to promote their new virtual world. Users were asked to act as agents of the Petpet Protection League to help Petpets safely cross over from Petaria to Neopia's Petpet Park. Missions were given by a non-player character named Weltrude, who acted as head of the Petpet Protection League Headquarters.Over the course of several weeks, users solved various puzzles and led the six Petpet species safely to Petpet Park. During the missions, users learned information about the Petpet species including temperament, favourite foods, and special skills in addition to Petpet Park storyline. On October 27, the Mission Headquarters was updated, and players who successfully helped the Petpets received rewards, which included Neopoints, a site theme, and a Petpet Park wearable.

Site content 
Petpet Park revolved around Petpets, small Neopian creatures who accompany Neopets. Once adopted, users could customise their Petpet with clothing and feed them. Users could play games to earn Park Points (Petpet Park currency) to buy clothing and food. Users could also chat and interact with other users and play games.

Petpets 
There were 9 species of Petpets to choose from in Petpet Park. Each had its own traits, though they did not affect gameplay. Three of the species were exclusive to the morphing potions and possibly potential "limited edition" Petpets.

Dipni: Dipnis were timid, wary Petpets that were easily startled. Despite this, they were still affectionate and shyly inquisitive, and they made gurgling noises when they were happy.
Oukin: Oukins were normally tranquil Petpets, but their warning shriek could call other Oukins to their aid.
Pinixy: Pinixy were active, rambunctious Petpets, always engaged in some physical activity or another, whether it was running, jumping, wrestling, or climbing.
Hifflo: Hifflos were sweet, affectionate Petpets that possessed great grace and a love for music. Although they liked to relax, they could run very fast for short distances.
Drym: Dryms were curious, mischievous Petpets, though they were more a source of amusement than they were troublemakers. They loved digging for shiny objects, and they were especially fond of burrowing through snow.
 Kassegat: Kassegats were intelligent, clever Petpets that lived in lush jungle areas. 
Bandalu: Bandalus were wise and friendly creatures that were only attainable through Neocash morphing potions.
 Puxa: Puxa were swift agile creatures that were only attainable through Neocash morphing potions.
 Mumbat: Mumbats were mischievous and fun-loving.

Exclusive content 
Certain features on Petpet Park required users to buy a membership to access them. As on Neopets, Petpet Park allowed the use of NC Mall to purchase items to customise a user's Petpet, but users could sample clothing before purchase. The NC Mall opened in Petpet Park in July 2009.

Shutdown 
On September 18, 2014, Neopets closed Petpet Park after being purchased by JumpStart.

References

External links 

Jellyneo's Guide to Petpet Park
FGN-Guild Petpet Park Plot Guide

Internet properties established in 2008
 
Virtual pet video games
Inactive massively multiplayer online games